New Music Ensemble may refer to:

New Music Ensemble (California), founded by Larry Austin in 1972
New Music Ensemble (London)  at Goldsmiths, University of London, 2014
New Music Ensemble, Joel Marangella
New Music Ensemble, Towson University
New Music Ensemble, Singapore's Yong Siew Toh Conservatory of Music, Chan Tze Law
Pittsburgh New Music Ensemble Kevin Noe
New Music Ensemble, University of Texas, Arlington

See also
Psappha New Music Ensemble North West of England
Cardboard Citizens New Music Ensemble experimental music group based in London
New York New Music Ensemble (NYNME) contemporary music Pierrot ensemble. Since 1976
Juventas New Music Ensemble